Western Yamuna Canal is canal in river Yamuna that was dug out and renovated in 1335 CE by Firoz Shah Tughlaq. In 1750 CE, excessive silting caused it to stop flowing. The British raj undertook a three-year renovation in 1817 by Captain GR Blane of the Bengal Engineer Group. In 1832-33 Tajewala Barrage dam at Yamuna was also built to regulate the flow of water, and later Pathrala barrage at Dadupur and Somb river dam downstream of canal were constructed in 1875-76. In 1889-95 the largest branch of the canal Sirsa branch was constructed. The modern Hathni Kund Barrage was built in 1999 to handle the problem of silting to replace the older Tajewala Barrage.

Thus, during the summer season, the stretch above Agra resembles a minor stream.

Hydel Power 
The Western Yamuna Canal has several major barrages and dams, including Hathni Kund Barrage, Tajewala Barrage, Pathrala barrage at Dadupur and Somb river dam, some of which are also used for the hydel power generation.

Western Yamuna Command area 

The canals irrigate vast tracts of land in the region in Ambala district, Karnal district, Sonepat district, Rohtak district, Jind district, Hisar district and Bhiwani district.

Western Yamuna Command Network 
The 86 km long main canal has the total length of 325 km not including its branches such as Sirsa branch, Hansi branch, Butana branch, Sunder branch, Delhi branch, along with hundreds of major and minor irrigation channels which are also breeding grounds for many species of birds.

Munak Canal 

The Munak canal, is a 102 kilometer long aqueduct in Haryana and Delhi states in India. The canal conveys water from the Yamuna River at Munak, Karnal district, Haryana and travels in a southerly direction, terminating at Haidarpur, Delhi. It is one of the primary sources of drinking water for Delhi. A memorandum of understanding was signed between the Haryana and Delhi governments in 1996 and the Canal was constructed by Haryana between 2003 and 2012 on payment by Delhi. Originally a porous trench, the canal was eventually cemented due to excess seepage, saving 80 million gallons of water per day.

Delhi Branch 
The portion of Munak canal is also called Delhi Branch, 22 km canal was built in 1819, and renovated in 2008, originates at Munak village in Gharaunda tehsil of Karnal district is a branch of Western Yaumna Canal to bring 700 cusecs water to Delhi.

Bhalaut Branch 
The Bhalaut Branch, originating at Khubru village, is a sub-branch of Delhi branch of Western Yaumna Canal that flows through Jhajjar district.

Jhajjar Branch 
The Jhajjar Branch is a sub-branch of Bhalaut branch of Western Yaumna Canal that flows through Jhajjar district.

Sirsa Branch 

The Sirsa Branch, built in 1896 and originating at Indri, is a sub-branch of Sirsa branch of Western Yaumna Canal which menders through Kaithal district, Jind district, Fatehabad district and Sirsa district.

Jind Branch 
The Jind Branch is a branch of Western Yaumna Canal which menders through Jind district.

Barwala Branch 
The Barwala Branch is a sub-branch of Sirsa branch of Western Yaumna Canal. It meanders through Barwala tehsil of Hisar district.

Hansi Branch 
The Hansi Branch, built in 1825 and remodeled in 1959, originating at Munak canal at Munak village in Gharaunda tehsil of Karnal district is a branch of Western Yaumna Canal that meanders through Hansi tehsil of Hisar district.

This branch was built in the paleochannel of seasonal Chautang river which is a relict of Drishadvati river flowing from Kaithal to Hisar district, passing through the towns of Jind, Hansi, Hisar, largest Indus Valley civilization site of Rakhigarhi and ancient Agroha Mound. Drishadvati river itself was a tributary of extinct Sarasvati River which stills flows in the forms of Ghaggar-Hakra River.

Butana sub-branch 
The Butana Branch is a sub-branch of Western Yaumna Canal's Hansi Branch that meanders through Hansi tehsil of Hisar district.

Sunder distributory 
The Sunder Branch of Western Yamuna Canal is a sub-branch of Butana branch of Hansi branch and goes to Kanwari and beyond in Hisar (district).

Bhiwani Branch 
The Bhiwani Branch, built in 1985, is a sub-branch of Western Yaumna Canal that meanders through Bhiwani district.

Rohtak Branch 
The Rohtak Branch is a sub-branch of Jind branch of Western Yaumna Canal and it meanders through Rohtak district.

Jawahar Lal Nehru Lift Irrigation Project 
Jawahar Lal Nehru Lift Irrigation Projectfor bringing water from Khubaru to 1st Lift Station JF-1 at Akedi Madanpur up to JF-2 at Salawas Rewari. Therefrom  water is lifted for Mahendergarh Canal taking water to Mahendragarh districts of South and South Western Haryana.Lift Irrigation, was approved by the {panning Commission in 1976 as part of the 5th Five-Year Plan and completed during the 7th Five-Year Plan (1985–1990) at a cost of INR 40.30 crore with a command area of 249,900 hectares and irrigation potential of 154,640 hectares. It Forks off as the Salhawas Channel from the Loharu Feeder Canal of the Western Yamuna Canal.The original design capacity of the JLN Canal, which is basically a feeder canal has been 3241 Cusec which was revised to 3541 cusec to accommodate water requirement of two power plants in the region. However the canal operation could never cross 2400 cusec. Chief Engineer Satbir Singh Kadian, an IITian studied the canal afresh in September 2016 and after some engineering, the canal capacity was restored. JLN Feeder Canal has been successfully running at full, original design, capacity of 3250 cusec since 2017. This has increased crop area in Loharu, Narnaul, Mahendergarh, Charkhi Dadari and Rewari areas besides improving the water table in the region.

Project has the following distributaries and minors:
 Dewana distributary
 Gehli Distributary
 Hasanpur distributary
 Laduwas distributary
 Madogarh Distributary
 Narnaul Distributary
 Nolpur distributary
 Rasauli distributary
 Shahbazpur distributary
 Alipur Minor
 Ateli Monor
 Dhancholi Minor
 Gopal Minor
 Jawahar Lal Nehru Canal 
 Khamania Minor
 Kheri Minor

Lal Bahadur Shastri Channel
 Salhawas Minor

Sutlej Yamuna Link Canal 

However, the proposal met obstacles

However, the proposal met obstacles and was referred to the Supreme Court of India. It defines river water sharing between Punjab & Haryana states.

See also

External links
 Canal network of Haryana, based on water from Western Yamuna Canal

References 

Canals in Haryana
Irrigation in Haryana
Canals in Hisar district
Yamuna River
Yamunanagar district
Water Heritage Sites in India